Marcelo Henrique Passos Carné (born 6 February 1990), is a Brazilian footballer who plays as a goalkeeper for Marítimo.

Club career

Flamengo
Carné began his career in the youth team of Bangu, but joined Flamengo's youth setup in 2004, aged 14. He was promoted to the main squad in 2010, but subsequently served loans at Boavista and Duque de Caxias.

Career statistics

Honours

International
Brazil
South American Under-15 Football Championship: 2005
South American Under-17 Football Championship: 2007

References

External links

1990 births
Living people
Footballers from Rio de Janeiro (city)
Brazilian footballers
Association football goalkeepers
CR Flamengo footballers
Boavista Sport Club players
Duque de Caxias Futebol Clube players
Tombense Futebol Clube players
Nova Iguaçu Futebol Clube players
Brasília Futebol Clube players
América Futebol Clube (Teófilo Otoni) players
Audax Rio de Janeiro Esporte Clube players
Bonsucesso Futebol Clube players
Esporte Clube Juventude players
Centro Sportivo Alagoano players
C.S. Marítimo players
Campeonato Brasileiro Série A players
Campeonato Brasileiro Série B players
Campeonato Brasileiro Série C players
Primeira Liga players
Expatriate footballers in Portugal
Brazilian expatriate sportspeople in Portugal
Footballers at the 2007 Pan American Games
Pan American Games competitors for Brazil
21st-century Brazilian people